Cunningham is an unincorporated community in Fayette County, in the U.S. state of Ohio.

History
Cunningham was a station on the Cincinnati, Hamilton and Dayton Railroad.

References

Unincorporated communities in Fayette County, Ohio
Unincorporated communities in Ohio